Natalie Grenier (born March 11, 1964) is a former Canadian female speed skater. She competed at the 1984 Winter Olympics and 1988 Winter Olympics representing Canada.

In the 1988 Winter Olympics, she refused to take part in the women's 3000m event due to heavy cold in the night. The sources also claimed that Grenier was the fiancée to a popular American speed skating world champion, Dan Jansen.

References 

1964 births
Living people
Canadian female speed skaters
French Quebecers
Laval Rouge et Or athletes
Olympic speed skaters of Canada
Speed skaters at the 1984 Winter Olympics
Speed skaters at the 1988 Winter Olympics
Speed skaters from Quebec City
20th-century Canadian women